Jalajala (also spelled as Jala-jala), officially the Municipality of Jalajala,  is a 4th class municipality in the province of Rizal, Philippines. According to the 2020 census, it has a population of 34,017 people.

Etymology
What is now the town's Barangay Punta was the seat of an earlier settlement later known as Halaán. During the summer from April to May, the shores of Laguna de Bay along Punta would be filled with small shellfish locally known as halaán.

As is typical with many modern Philippine toponyms, the town's name supposedly resulted from miscommunication between early Spanish visitors and natives. The Spaniards enquired of some natives along the shoreline, "¿Como se llama este sitio?" ("What is the name of this place?") to which the latter replied, "halaán pò," thinking that the foreigners referred to the shells. The Spaniards accepted the response as the name of the place, and began calling it halaán, later corrupting it into Jalajala.

Another folk etymology is that Jalajala stems from an endemic breed of boar called berk jala, which is abundant in the wilds around the town and is depicted on its seal. As with the other story, a Spaniard asked the Tagalog-speaking natives the place's name, and the locals' interjection of "hala-hala” (possibly a hunting chant) was taken by the Spaniards to be their answer.

Geography

It lies on the eastern part of the Rizal Province and has a land area of  representing 3.77% of the total land area of the province. Jalajala's political boundary on the north is the Panguil River, wherein it shares the boundary with the town of Pakil in Laguna. On its southern, eastern, and western boundaries lies Laguna de Bay.

Mount Sembrano forms the boundary of Jalajala and Pililla.

Barangays

Jalajala is politically subdivided into eleven barangays (three urban, eight rural). Bayugo, Palay-Palay, and Sipsipin were elevated as barrios in 1956.
 Bagumbong
 Bayugo
 Second District (Poblacion)
 Third District (Poblacion)
 Lubo
 Pagkalinawan
 Palaypalay
 Punta
 Sipsipin
 First (Special) District (Poblacion)
 Paalaman

Climate

Demographics

Economy

References

External links

Jalajala Profile at PhilAtlas.com
Jalajala official website
[ Philippine Standard Geographic Code]
Philippine Census Information
Local Governance Performance Management System 

Municipalities of Rizal
Populated places on Laguna de Bay